Applied physics is physics which is intended for a particular technological or practical use.

Applied physics may also refer to:

Scientific journals
 Applied Physics, issued as two separate publications:
 Applied Physics A: Materials Science & Processing
 Applied Physics B: Lasers and Optics
 American Institute of Physics journals:
 Applied Physics Letters, published weekly
 Applied Physics Reviews, published annually
 Applied Physics Express, a scientific journal publishing letters

Institutions
 Applied Physics, Inc.  
 Applied Physics Corporation, now the Cary Instruments division of Varian
 Applied Physics Laboratory Ice Station, U.S.A. and Japanese laboratory
 Johns Hopkins University Applied Physics Laboratory

TV
 "Applied Physics" (Sliders), a television episode